The Ontario Confederation of Regions Party ran a number of candidates in the 1990 provincial election, none of whom were elected.  The party polls surprisingly well in some northern and eastern Ontario constituencies.  Information about the party's candidates may be found here.

Eva Longhurst (St. Catharines)
No information.  Longhurst received 2,384 votes (7.99%), finishing fourth against Liberal incumbent Jim Bradley.

Candidates in Ontario provincial elections
Ontario Provincial Confederation of Regions Party politicians